Joggling is a competitive sport that combines juggling with jogging. People who joggle are called jogglers.

The most common objects used in joggling are juggling balls, or sometimes juggling clubs, but any set of three or more objects can be used. However, in competitions or long term events, most jogglers prefer to use palm-size beanbags stuffed with birdseed because they are light enough for long distances but heavy enough to withstand winds. The juggling is usually done in a three-ball cascade pattern, which is efficient and uses the least energy. Jogglers say that the arm motions of juggling with three objects feels natural with the action and pace of jogging.

Rules

The rules that define joggling in competitions and races are:

A juggling pattern must be maintained while running.
If an object is dropped, the joggler must return to the point he dropped and continue.

Competition

The World Joggling Championships are held each year as one of the events of the International Jugglers' Association juggling festival, where results are recorded and medals awarded. Anyone can compete in the World Joggling Championships, but competitors need to be able to juggle three balls proficiently. All registrants must pay an entry fee, which covers any to all of the events entered for one juggler, and complete and sign a liability waiver. Some events require meeting a qualifying standard (e.g. in a former meet, competitors in the 400 meter 5-ball event need to have completed the 100 meter 5-ball event in less than 90 seconds). The meet schedule for the World Joggling Championships most commonly includes races ranging from 100 meters to 1600 meters, with the occasional novel-yet-standardized distance, prop count, or obstacle.  Frequently, world record attempts will be held at these meets (e.g. 800m, 5K, and 10K record attempts in the last decade), as well as relay races in which teammates pass one ball to the next relay runner, who holds two in the handoff zone. The schedule also often includes 4-ball, 5-ball, and 7-ball events, which require much greater technical juggling skills as opposed to flat-out speed.  Competitions have been virtual through the COVID-19 pandemic, with the intent of incorporating both virtual and in-person event blocks when the health risk diminishes.

The first championships were held in 1980 at the IJA juggling festival in Fargo, North Dakota. They were organized by Bill Giduz, an avid joggler who edited the IJA Newsletter at the time in an attempt to interest others in the activity. Two races were held on that occasion—a 100-yard race across a football field that was won by Brad Heffler in 13.4 seconds, and a one-mile run on an indoor track that was won by Canadian comic entertainer Michel Lauzière. Lauzière was late to the start line and ran his race barefoot.

2022 World Joggling Championships
Virtual (Full In-Frame Video Submissions Required), In-Person World Championships likely to resume in 2023

International Jugglers' Association 75th Festival

Full Results from Block A and Block B are as follows:

Divisions: B12 - Boys 12-and-Under, B17 - Boys 13-to-17, MO - Men's Open, MM - Men's Masters

Divisions: G17 - Girls 17-and-Under, WO - Women's Open, WM - Women's Masters

2021 World Joggling Championships
Virtual due to the ongoing pandemic (Full In-Frame Video Submissions Required, Deadline: July 15, 2021, 11:59pm GMT)

International Jugglers' Association Festival (Online/Virtual)

Divisions: B12 - Boys 12-and-Under, B17 - Boys 13-to-17, MO - Men's Open, MM - Men's Masters

Divisions: G17 - Girls 17-and-Under, WO - Women's Open, WM - Women's Masters

Time Attack Division: Entries were redone due to footage discrepancies and capped at initial time submission

2020 World Joggling Championships
Virtual due to the ongoing pandemic (Full In-Frame Video Submissions Required, Deadline: July 18, 2020, 4:00pm GMT)

International Jugglers' Association 74th Festival (Online/Virtual)

ª Honorable Mention: Aaron Scott - 2:35.41, Verifiable Fun Run video submission ranks 3rd in Competitive

Physical Medals awarded in following divisions: 3b100/400/800/Mile/5K, 5b100/400, 7b100; Individual Ranks used to eliminate multiple per-person ranking

Divisions: B12 - Boys 12-and-Under, B17 - Boys 13-to-17, MO - Men's Open, MM - Men's Masters

Divisions: G17 - Girls 17-and-Under, WO - Women's Open, WM - Women's Masters

2019 World Joggling Championships

Purdue University Track - Fort Wayne, Indiana, USA (June 29, 2019)

International Jugglers' Association 72nd Annual Festival

ª Both Mark Fiore and Sterling Franklin broke Jamie Whoolery's 60m World Record from 2001 at this track meet.

b Timer Results for Eric Walter's 800m WR attempt: 2:13.00, 2:12.82, 2:13.01. Average time 2:12.94 registers as a new Guinness WR.

c Additional 1600m run was done after main 8 events and timed by a meet organizer, Aaron Scott 5:24, Sterling Franklin 5:39

Divisions: B12 - Boys 12-and-Under, B17 - Boys 13-to-17, MO - Men's Open, MM - Men's Masters

Divisions: WO - Women's Open, WM - Women's Masters, Mixed - Men and Women (Relay)

2018 World Joggling Championships
Springfield College Track - Springfield, Massachusetts, USA (July 21, 2018)

International Jugglers' Association 71st Annual Festival

ª Matt Feldman ran the 100 meter 5-ball again as a world record attempt.  With a time of 14.10, the exhibition run ended up as #2 all-time.

Divisions: B12 - Boys 12-and-Under, B17 - Boys 13-to-17, MO - Men's Open, MM - Men's Masters

Divisions: WO - Women's Open, WM - Women's Masters, Mixed - Men and Women (Relay)

2017 World Joggling Championships
Coe College Track - Cedar Rapids, Iowa, USA and Certified 5K Course in Lisbon, Iowa, USA (July 22, 2017)

International Jugglers' Association 70th Annual Festival

Divisions: B12 - Boys 12-and-Under, B17 - Boys 13-to-17, MO - Men's Open, MM - Men's Masters, Mixed - Mixed Men and Women (Relay)

Divisions: G12 - Girls 12-and-Under, G17 - Girls 13-to-17, WO - Women's Open, WM - Women's Masters

2016 World Joggling Championships
El Paso, Texas, USA (July 30, 2016)

International Jugglers' Association 69th Annual Festival

Divisions: B12 - Boys 12-and-Under, B17 - Boys 13-to-17, MO - Men's Open, MM - Men's Masters

Divisions: WO - Women's Open, WM - Women's Masters, Mixed - Mixed Men and Women (Relay)

2015 World Joggling Championships
Québec City, Québec, Canada (July 25, 2015)

International Jugglers' Association 68th Annual Festival

Overall Top Performances:

ª Adjusted to 1600m equivalent: Several heats of the 1600m were run on a 1790m path

2014 World Joggling Championships
Purdue University - West Lafayette, Indiana (August 2, 2014)

International Jugglers' Association 67th Annual Festival

Overall Top Performances:

2013 World Joggling Championships
Bowling Green State University - Bowling Green, Ohio (July 20, 2013)

International Jugglers' Association 66th Annual Festival

Overall Top Performances:

Qualifiers: 100m 7-ball: Must be able to juggle 7 consistently, 400m 5-ball: Must finish 100m 5-ball event in under 90 seconds to qualify.

2012 World Joggling Championships
Winston-Salem, North Carolina (July 21, 2012)

International Jugglers' Association 65th Annual Festival

Overall Top Performances:

2011 World Joggling Championships
Rochester, Minnesota. Conditions: 96 degrees, sunny, strong headwind on homestretch.

International Jugglers' Association 64th Annual Festival

2010 World Joggling Championships
Results from the 2010 World Joggling Championships (July 27, 2010 in Sparks, Nevada)

International Jugglers' Association 63rd Annual Festival

'"IJA World Ball Juggler"'
3 ball 50 meters Jason Cunningham 2:46.1

2009 World Joggling Championships
International Jugglers' Association 62nd Annual Festival

2008 World Joggling Championships
International Jugglers' Association 61st Annual Festival

Other
Additional races and exhibitions have been organized in recent years by Albert Lucas for the International Sport Juggling Federation, including an exhibition race at the 2001 Prefontaine Classic in Eugene, Oregon. Lucas has joggled marathons, and has joggled in races over hurdle courses.

World Records

International media footage has featured the battle for the marathon record between Canadian Michal Kapral and American Zach Warren. The history of the record includes:

At one point, Albert Lucas simultaneously held the record for "Most Objects Juggled" and "Fastest Marathon While Juggling."

References

Juggling
Running by type

zh:跑步